The canton of Trégueux is an administrative division of the Côtes-d'Armor department, northwestern France. It was created at the French canton reorganisation which came into effect in March 2015. Its seat is in Trégueux.

It consists of the following communes:
Hillion
Langueux
Trégueux
Yffiniac

References

Cantons of Côtes-d'Armor